Amritpal Singh (born 9 January 2001) is an Indian professional footballer who plays as a defender  for I-League club Rajasthan United, on loan from Indian Super League club Hyderabad.

Club career
Amritpal began his football career with the FC Pune City Academy in 2016 before joining Hyderabad FC Reserves Hyderabad FC Reserves in 2019. After featuring for HFC B over two years in various competitions, he was promoted to the first team in 2021–22 season, and was part of the HFC side that won the Indian Super League title in 2022.

Honours
Hyderabad FC
 Indian Super League: 2021–22

References

Living people
2001 births
Indian footballers
Association football defenders
Hyderabad FC players